Megarasbora elanga, commonly known as the Bengala barb is a fish of the carp family Cyprinidae, found commonly in rivers and freshwater lakes in and around Bangladesh. It is a valued food fish and is a species of commercial importance and the population is believed to be declining due to overfishing and habitat destruction.

References
 

Megarasbora
Fish of Bangladesh
Fish of Asia
Fish of Pakistan
Taxa named by Albert Günther
Taxobox binomials not recognized by IUCN